Jo Anne Simon (born 1952) is an American attorney and politician serving as a member of the New York State Assembly for the 52nd District of the New York State Assembly. She is a Democrat. The district includes portions of Brooklyn Heights, Downtown Brooklyn, Cobble Hill, Carroll Gardens, Gowanus, Park Slope, Boerum Hill and DUMBO in Brooklyn. She was a candidate for Congress in New York's newly redrawn 10th congressional district in 2022.

Early life and education
Simon was born in Yonkers, New York. A first-generation college student, she earned a Bachelor of Arts degree from Iona College. She later earned a Master of Arts degree from Gallaudet University, and a Juris Doctor from the Fordham University School of Law.

Career 
After graduating from law school, Simon established a disability civil rights law firm in Downtown Brooklyn. She also worked as an adjunct assistant professor of law at Fordham University. A resident of Brooklyn for nearly forty years, Simon formerly served as the president of the Boerum Hill Association before being elected to the New York State Assembly. In 2014, she was elected district leader and state committeewoman for the 52nd Assembly district.

On October 1, 2020, Simon announced her candidacy for Brooklyn Borough President in front of James Madison High School as a tribute to Ruth Bader Ginsburg. If she had been elected, she would have been the first woman to hold the office; she finished in second place, behind City Council member Antonio Reynoso.

New York Assembly
In 2014, nine-term Assemblywoman Joan Millman announced she would retire. Soon after, Simon announced she would enter the race to succeed her. In a three-way primary, Simon secured over 53% of the vote and won the general election with 69% of the vote.

Simon was sworn into office on January 1, 2015. In the Assembly, she serves as the chair of the Subcommittee on Tuition Assistance Programs.

Personal life 
Simon is married to Bill Harris and resides in Boerum Hill.

References

External links
New York State Assemblywoman Jo Anne Simon government website

1952 births
21st-century American politicians
21st-century American women politicians
Candidates in the 2021 United States elections
Candidates in the 2022 United States House of Representatives elections
Fordham University School of Law alumni
Gallaudet University alumni
Iona University alumni
Living people
Democratic Party members of the New York State Assembly
People from Boerum Hill, Brooklyn
People from Yonkers, New York
Politicians from Brooklyn
Women state legislators in New York (state)